Polyphonic HMI is a music analysis company jointly founded in Barcelona, Spain by Mike McCready and an artificial intelligence firm called Grupo AIA. Its principal product is called "Hit Song Science" (HSS) which uses various statistical and signal processing techniques to help record companies predict whether a particular song will have commercial success.

Polyphonic HMI and HSS have caused some controversy in the music industry because of fears (denied by Polyphonic HMI) that it removes the "magic" from music production.

Several stars are suspected to have used the system to improve their chances of having a hit, including:

Norah Jones
Anastacia
Maroon 5

The software correctly predicted the success of Norah Jones' debut album Come Away with Me months before it topped the charts, contradicting skeptical studio executives.

In December 2005, amidst disagreements with Polyphonic's parent company, the senior management team, including co-founder Mike McCready and the advisory board made up of music industry veterans, left the company and formed Platinum Blue Music Intelligence, a competing company based in New York City.

References

External links
 Article in Le Monde about Polyphonic HMI
 Hit Song Science Is Not Yet a Science - a study that appeared in ISMIR 2008.

Music companies of Spain
Mass media companies of Spain
Mass media in Barcelona